Charlie Edwards (born 8 February 1993) is a British professional boxer. He held the WBC flyweight title from 2018 to 2019, and once challenged for the IBF flyweight title in 2016. At regional level, he held the British super-flyweight title in 2017.  He is the older brother of flyweight world champion of boxing, Sunny Edwards.

As of June 2020, Edwards is ranked as the world's fifth best active flyweight by BoxRec, fifth by the Transnational Boxing Rankings Board and fifth by The Ring.

Early life
Edwards was born on 8 February 1993, in Sutton. He started boxing at the age of 11 as a means to lose weight and it was apparent early on that there existed a bright path for him within the sport if pursued with true commitment . He would then go on to represent the long-standing Repton Boxing Club in London, whilst also getting his brother Sunny into boxing. He grew up being influenced by legendary boxers Sugar Ray Leonard and Manny Pacquiao.

Amateur career
He won the 2011 Amateur Boxing Association British light-flyweight title, when boxing out of the Lynn ABC. Three years later in 2014 he won the flyweight title boxing out of Repton ABC.

Professional career
Edwards turned professional in 2015, debuting at The O2 Arena with a fourth-round technical knockout win. Edwards compiled a record of 13–1, and was ranked #15 by the WBC before shocking and defeating Cristofer Rosales to win the WBC flyweight title.

On 31 August 2019, Edwards defended his title against Julio Cesar Martinez at the O2 Arena on the undercard of Vasyl Lomachenko vs. Luke Campbell. Martinez came out determined and managed to stop Edwards with 1:43 left in the third round. Edwards was not able to beat the count, and initially Martinez was awarded a knockout victory. After the video replay was shown, it was evident that Martinez had hit Edwards with a body shot with the latter already on the floor with one knee. The fight would therefore be ruled a no contest, with WBC president Mauricio Sulaiman ordering an immediate rematch.

In October 2019, he announced that he had vacated the WBC flyweight title due to health concerns over making weight at flyweight.

Professional boxing record

See also
List of world flyweight boxing champions
List of British world boxing champions

References

External links

Charlie Edwards Official Website
Charlie Edwards – Profile, News Archive & Current Rankings at Box.Live

|-

|-

1993 births
Living people
English male boxers
Boxers from Greater London
People from Sutton, London
Flyweight boxers
Super-flyweight boxers
World flyweight boxing champions
England Boxing champions
British Boxing Board of Control champions
World Boxing Council champions